The ten-lanced nobles, also Szepes lancers, Spiš lancers, or lance-bearers of Szepes (szepesi lándzsásnemesek) were group of conditional noblemen living in the Szepes region of the Kingdom of Hungary (present-day Spiš in Slovakia). These nobles were previously part of the contingent assigned with border guard duties in the periphery of the conquered territories in the region. In the thirteenth century, some of these groups were officially integrated into the Hungarian nobility. They received their privileges from King Béla IV of Hungary in 1243. They were obliged to equip ten knights or lancers. They were not subject to the authority of the ispán (or head) of Szepes County and tax was collected from them only if the "royal servants" (or noblemen) were also required to pay it. Initially, they formed about 40 families, but their number decreased to less than 20 families by the 16th century. They lost their special status in 1804.

References

Sources

 

Conditional nobility (Kingdom of Hungary)